Mohammad Isa bin Abdul Halim (born 15 May 1986) is a former Singapore international footballer who played as a defensive midfielder. He started out playing football as a centre forward in his youth.

Club career
Isa has previously played for S.League clubs Woodlands Wellington, Young Lions and Home United. On 27 June 2015 Isa moved from LionsXII to Tampines Rovers, in the process teaming up with his former coach V. Sundramoorthy.

He reckons that the 2018 AFF Suzuki Cup will be of utmost importance to Thailand and the Philippines, in an article by FOX Sports Asia.

International career
He made his debut for the Singapore on 11 October 2005 against Cambodia.

He was part of the team that won the 2007 AFF Championship.

He was also part of the Singapore Under-23 team that took part in the 2005 Southeast Asian Games in Philippines and also won a bronze medal for the 2007 edition in Korat, Thailand.

Personal life
According to an interview done in November 2007, Isa only got interested in football after watching a match Singapore and Malaysia with his grandfather. Isa started playing football competitively when he was 13 years old, back in his secondary school days, playing for Greenridge Secondary School. But it was only two years later when he got selected for Woodlands Wellington and Singapore Under-16 teams did he take football seriously.

Isa used to front the football side of things for German-sportswear company, Adidas in Singapore along with other teammates in the national team like Lionel Lewis. In February 2008, he with a dozen other world-renowned footballers like Lionel Messi, Arjen Robben and David Villa graced the Adidas worldwide launch of the F50 TUNiT football boot at the Centre Convencions Internacional in Barcelona, Spain. He has switched over to Puma along with other Singaporean footballers such as Shi Jiayi, Juma'at Jantan, Lionel Lewis and Erwan Gunawan.

Career statistics

International

International goals

Honours

Club
LionsXII
Malaysia Super League: 2013
FA Cup Malaysia: 2015

International
Singapore
AFF Football Championship: 2007, 2012
Southeast Asian Games: Bronze Medal – 2007

References

External links
data2.7m.cn

fas.org.sg
fas.org.sg
goal.com
lionsxii.sg

1986 births
Living people
Singaporean footballers
Singapore international footballers
Woodlands Wellington FC players
Home United FC players
Singapore Premier League players
LionsXII players
Singaporean people of Malay descent
Association football midfielders
Association football defenders
Malaysia Super League players
Young Lions FC players
Tampines Rovers FC players
Footballers at the 2006 Asian Games
Southeast Asian Games bronze medalists for Singapore
Southeast Asian Games medalists in football
Competitors at the 2007 Southeast Asian Games
Asian Games competitors for Singapore